Nerezi is a village in North Macedonia, located in the Struga municipality near in the Drimkol region.

Location
Nerezi is found in the north-western section of the Struga municipality. Until 2004 it was a part of the Lukovo municipality. It is located 26 kilometres from the city of Struga. The highest point of the village is 1096.
At just 25 km distance from Struga and the Ohrid Lake, on above sea level of 870m lies the village of Nerezi. The village is situated on the mountain of Jablanica, surrounded with breathtaking nature, clean air and untouched springs of clean drinking water.

Demographics
The village is populated by 213 inhabitants of whom 212 are Macedonians. Today there are around hundred of houses and around hundred and twenty inhabitants living in the village.

Features
The village is home to an old church and a monastery.

Nerezi is a village of 6 churches, from which 2 are ruined, while the other 4 still exist. Those churches are: St. Nicholas, the church of Holy Salvation, the church of Holy Mother the Most Innocent and St. Georges – renovated in 1833.

Villages in Struga Municipality